Matti Langer (born 27 February 1990) is a German footballer who plays as a midfielder for FC Carl Zeiss Jena.

References

External links
 

1990 births
Living people
Sportspeople from Erfurt
German footballers
Association football midfielders
FC Rot-Weiß Erfurt players
FSV Wacker 90 Nordhausen players
SC Freiburg II players
SpVgg Greuther Fürth II players
SpVgg Greuther Fürth players
Chemnitzer FC players
FC Carl Zeiss Jena players
2. Bundesliga players
3. Liga players
Regionalliga players
Footballers from Thuringia